Timiryazevo is a rural locality (a selo) in Tkhorevskoye Rural Settlement, Kamensky District, Voronezh Oblast, Russia. The population was 536 as of 2010. There are 8 streets.

Geography 
Timiryazevo is located 4 km northwest of Kamenka (the district's administrative centre) by road. Kamenka is the nearest rural locality.

References 

Rural localities in Kamensky District, Voronezh Oblast